Donald K. Helgeson was a member of the Wisconsin State Assembly.

Biography
Helgeson was born on May 30, 1932, in Manitowoc, Wisconsin. He graduated from high school in Valders, Wisconsin and from the University of Wisconsin-Madison. During the Korean War, he served in the United States Navy. Helgeson died in 1976.

Political career
Helgeson was elected to the Assembly in 1968 and re-elected in 1970. He was a Republican.

References

1932 births
1976 deaths
20th-century American politicians
Military personnel from Wisconsin
United States Navy sailors
United States Navy personnel of the Korean War
University of Wisconsin–Madison alumni
People from Manitowoc, Wisconsin
Republican Party members of the Wisconsin State Assembly